Francis Joseph Bruce "Frank" Smallman (1869–1941) was an English professional footballer who scored 23 goals from 58 appearances in the Football League playing as an outside right for Lincoln City.

Football career
Smallman was born in Willingham by Stow, Lincolnshire, in 1869. He made his debut for Lincoln City on 7 September 1889 in the Midland League, and was the club's leading scorer for that season with 17 goals in senior competitions. Smallman played for the club until the end of the 1892–93 season, their first in the Football League. He was ever-present during that season, and was the club's leading scorer with 19 goals in senior competitions, 17 in the League. He spent the 1893–94 season with Burton Wanderers in the Midland League before returning to Lincoln City for two more years. Smallman's last game for their first team came in the Football League Second Division, a 4–1 defeat to former club Burton Wanderers on 4 April 1896. Over both spells with Lincoln, he scored 53 goals from 120 senior appearances. Smallman died in Lincoln in 1941 at the age of 72.

References

1869 births
1941 deaths
Association football forwards
Lincoln City F.C. players
Burton Wanderers F.C. players
English Football League players
English footballers
People from Willingham by Stow